Upper Darby High School (UDHS) is a four-year public high school located in Upper Darby Township in Delaware County, Pennsylvania. It is part of the Upper Darby School District. Established in 1895, it is the oldest high school in Delaware County.

As of the 2019-2020 school year, the school had an enrollment of 3,845 students and 233.23 classroom teachers (on an FTE basis), for a student-teacher ratio of 16.49.

The population is diverse, with over 55 nationalities of students. It has a long-established football rivalry with Monsignor Bonner High School, located less than a block away. Upper Darby High School was a part of the inspiration for Upper Darby alumna Tina Fey's movie comedy Mean Girls.
The mascot of Upper Darby High is the Royal, which is portrayed as a lion. In previous years, it was a court jester. The school emblem is the royal oak tree, the yearbook is named the Oak, and the newspaper is called the Acorn. An Acorn award is rewarded every year at the UDAEF Sweet Night Out Foundation Ball in February.

Upper Darby Senior High School is one of the largest high schools in Pennsylvania by enrollment. The High School is also home to the Upper Darby Performing Arts Center, and the Summer Stage program.

Campus
The campus is adjacent to, but not within, the Drexel Hill census-designated place. It has a Drexel Hill postal address.

Demographics

Arts
Upper Darby High School is home to the Upper Darby Performing Arts Center, a nearly 1,800-seat theater that hosts not only school functions, but also between 200 and 400 events annually. During the summer, the arts center hosts the largest summer theater group in Delaware County: Summer Stage, with over 200 participants in multiple musicals. Harry Dietzler founded the Summer Stage program in 1976.

Extracurriculars
Upper Darby High School offers a wide variety of clubs, activities and an extensive sports program.

Sports
Upper Darby sports teams compete in the Central League.

The District funds:

Boys Sports:
Baseball – AAAA
Basketball	– AAAAA
Cross Country – AAA
Football – AAAA
Golf – AAA
Indoor Track and Field – AAAA
Lacrosse – AAAA
Soccer – AAA
Swimming and Diving -AAA
Tennis – AAA
Track and Field	– AAA
Wrestling – AAA
Girls Sports:
Basketball – AAAA
Cheerleading – AAAA
Cross Country – AAA
Field Hockey – AAA
Golf – AAA
Indoor Track and Field – AAAA
Lacrosse – AAAA
Soccer (Fall) – AAA
Softball – AAAA
Swimming and Diving – AAA
Girls' Tennis – AAA
Track and Field	 – AAA
Volleyball – AAA

According to PIAA directory July 2012

Notable alumni

Upper Darby High School's Wall of Fame committee recognizes individuals who have become leaders in their industries. Alumni recognized on Upper Darby High School's Wall of Fame members are indicated with WoF after their biographical summary:

Lloyd Alexander, former author and writer, The Black Cauldron. WoF
Keith Andes, former Broadway and film actor
Mario Civera, former Pennsylvania State Representative WoF
Jim Croce, former singer-songwriter WoF 
Mark Cronin, creator and producer of VH1 shows WoF
Tina Fey former senior writer, Saturday Night Live and scriptwriter and co-star, Mean Girls and 30 Rock WoF
D'or Fischer, former professional basketball player, Israeli National League
Derek Frey, film director and producer
D. Barry Gibbons, former Pennsylvania State Representative 
Kermit Gordon, former Brookings Institution president, Rhodes Scholar, former Office of Management and Budget director  WoF
Rei Hance, actress, The Blair Witch Project and Taken
Jeff LaBar, former rock musician, Cinderella
Simoni Lawrence, former professional football player, Canadian Football League
Bob Lloyd, former professional basketball player, New York Nets, and NCAA First Team All-American at Rutgers
F. Joseph Loeper, former Pennsylvania State Senator and Majority Leader WoF
David MacAdam, former head of image structure at Eastman Kodak Research Laboratory Optical Society of America president, discovered MacAdam ellipses
Shannon Meehan, Iraq War veteran, author, disabled Veterans activist WoF
Terrence J. Nolen, artistic director, Arden Theatre Company
Grace O'Connell, University of California, Berkeley bioengineer
Dorothy Germain Porter, amateur golfer, U.S. Women's Amateur golf champion in 1949 and U.S. Senior Women's Amateur champion in 1977, 1980, 1981, 1983 WoF
Jack Ramsay, former college and professional basketball coach and broadcaster WoF
Maaly Raw, hip hop producer for Lil Uzi Vert and others
Todd Rucci, former professional football player, New England Patriots
Todd Rundgren, rock musician and award-winning record producer
Alvin Sargent, two-time Academy Award winner for Julia and Ordinary People WoF
Marty Stern, former women's cross-country coach, Villanova Wildcats WoF
George Wackenhut, Wackenhut founder WoF
Floyd Wedderburn, former professional football player, Seattle Seahawks
Carolyn "Bunny" Welsh, former Chester County, Pennsylvania sheriff and one of 22 female sheriffs in the U.S. WoF
William Wharton, writer, Birdy, which was adapted into a film. WoF

References

External links

Upper Darby Performing Arts Center
Delaware County IU 25
Delaware County Technical High School
Delaware County Workforce Investment Board

Educational institutions established in 1895
Public high schools in Pennsylvania
Schools in Delaware County, Pennsylvania
1895 establishments in Pennsylvania